General elections were held in Bahrain in October 2010 to elect the forty members of the Council of Representatives. The first round of voting was held on 23 October, with a second round on 30 October. Amidst boycotts and arrests, Al Wefaq won 18 of the 40 seats. Four women were elected.

Campaign
The main opposition party Haq Movement and several other opposition parties such as the Al-Wafa Islamic Movement, Bahrain Freedom Movement, Khalas Movement and Islamic Action Society called for a boycott of the elections, on the grounds that participation would be "tantamount to accepting the unjust sectarian apartheid system."

There were also further arrests and repressions of the Shia majority. Shia political activists and international human rights watchdogs warned of a "drift back to full-blown authoritarianism." However, Foreign Minister Sheikh Khaled bin Ahmad al-Khalifa claimed the arrests were "not linked to elections." Amnesty International, Human Rights Watch and the Project on Middle East Democracy noted government arrests and repressions ahead of the election.

The head of the Al Wefaq party, Ali Salman, said the government should be shared with the people, in what was seen as an open challenge to the ruling Al-Khalifa dynasty. "It is unacceptable that power be monopolised by a single family, even one to which we owe respect and consideration. We look forward to the day when any child of the people, be they Sunni or Shia, can become prime minister."

Conduct
A total of 292 Bahraini observers from non-governmental organizations monitored the elections, though foreign observers were not allowed.

Allegations were made of problems on election day; Al Wefaq's Sheikh Ali Salman claimed at least 890 voters were not allowed to vote in mostly Shia districts because their names were absent from electoral lists. "This is not the full number. We expect it to be higher." The party tallied up the voters who said there were not allowed to vote, in order to use these numbers to challenge to the official results. The opposition also expressed concern that the authorities used the votes of military personnel in favour of some candidates at the expense of others in an "exploitation of general positions."

Results
More than 318,000 were eligible to vote. Head of the electoral commission and Justice Minister, Sheikh Khaled bin Ali al-Khalifa, gave an estimate of turnout of "at least 67 percent," less than the 72% in 2006 and 53.4% in 2002. 127 candidates stood in the election.

Al Wefaq won 18 of the 40 seats, one more than the previous election. Shia and independent candidates won a majority of seats for the first time.

Winning candidate by constituency

Reactions
Shia cleric and MP Sheikh Ali Salman lauded the result and called for a "more positive" stance from the government. "The most important message for the government is that Al Wefaq (INAA) is the largest political association in Bahrain. The people's will must be respected and dealt with positively."

Analysis
A local analyst, Obaidaly al-Obaidaly, said the press campaign that accompanied the arrests resulted in a favourable outcome for Al Wefaq. "The Shiites who were hesitant or intended to boycott the elections voted overwhelmingly in favour of Al Wefaq, the representative of their community. Baqer al-Najar, a sociology professor at the University of Bahrain also said "The way the media handled the security situation which prevailed prior to the elections unexpectedly raised Al Wefaq's shares. Shiites felt that they were targeted so they voted intensely for Al Wefaq despite their restlessness with its performance throughout the past four years."

Aftermath
Following the 2011 Bahraini protests, all 18 Al Wefaq MPs resigned from parliament.

References

Elections in Bahrain
Bahrain
General elections
National Assembly (Bahrain)
Election and referendum articles with incomplete results